Portlandia is an American  sketch comedy television series starring Fred Armisen and Carrie Brownstein, set in and around Portland, Oregon, and spoofing the city's reputation as a haven for eccentric hipsters. The show was produced by Broadway Video Television and IFC Original Productions. It was created by Armisen and Brownstein, along with Jonathan Krisel, who directs it. It debuted on IFC on January 21, 2011.

The show shared its title with the sculpture of the same name that sits above the entrance of the Portland Building on Fifth Avenue in downtown Portland, which appears in the show's title sequence.  The show has won a Peabody Award.

In January 2017, the series was renewed for an eighth and final season, which concluded on March 22, 2018.

Production

Conception and development
Brownstein and Armisen first met in 2003 and began collaborating on a series of comedy sketches for the Internet in 2005 titled ThunderAnt. The sketches became increasingly Portland-centric, with premises ranging from irate diners at a popular Hawthorne District restaurant registering ridiculous complaints on the review website Yelp! to a character's disastrous one-man performance at the city's Hollywood Theatre.

In July 2009, the duo pitched their idea for a full-fledged sketch comedy show to IFC and Lorne Michaels' Broadway Video production company, and the project was quickly approved.

Some of the content on the show first appeared in the web series; the "Women & Women First" feminist bookstore sketch and its owners' characters, Toni and Candace, originated there.

Filming and production
The series is set and filmed on location in Portland, Oregon. Production for the first season, consisting of six episodes, began in August 2010 and was completed in September 2010. The budget for the first season was set at less than $1 million (US). Along with Allison Silverman, a former head writer and executive producer for The Colbert Report, and Portlandia director Jonathan Krisel, Armisen and Brownstein wrote the sketches that appear in the first six episodes. Lorne Michaels served as executive producer.

The series stars Fred Armisen and Carrie Brownstein in various roles. Guest stars include: Kirsten Dunst; Olivia Wilde; Selma Blair; Chloë Sevigny; Roseanne Barr; Steve Buscemi; Claire Danes; Kristen Wiig; Rose Byrne; Andy Samberg; Rachel Bloom; Ed Begley Jr.; Aimee Mann; Johnny Marr; Sarah McLachlan; KD Lang; Jello Biafra; Kurt Vile; Heather Graham; Parker Posey; Michael Nesmith; Glenn Danzig; Aubrey Plaza; Rashida Jones; Anna Gunn; Jane Lynch; Kumail Nanjiani; Jason Sudeikis; Ehren McGhehey; Eddie Vedder of Pearl Jam; Greta Gerwig; Edward James Olmos; Brigitte Nielsen; J Mascis of Dinosaur Jr.; Kate Pierson, Cindy Wilson and Fred Schneider of The B-52's; Josh Homme of Queens of the Stone Age; Gus Van Sant; Tim Robbins; Martina Navratilova; Jeff Goldblum; Joanna Newsom; Annie Clark of St. Vincent; Jack White; Paul Simon; Henry Rollins; Krist Novoselic; Portland Trail Blazers players LaMarcus Aldridge, Damian Lillard, CJ McCollum, and Robin Lopez as themselves; and Kyle MacLachlan as a fictional mayor of Portland. Actual Portland mayor Sam Adams is also featured as an assistant to the mayor. Another episode, including a fictionalized music festival similar to Portland's actual MusicfestNW, featured a rock band played by Colin Meloy and Jenny Conlee of The Decemberists; James Mercer of The Shins; Brownstein's Sleater-Kinney bandmates Corin Tucker and Janet Weiss; and Isaac Brock of Modest Mouse.

On February 14, 2011, IFC ordered a ten-episode second season, which began airing in January 2012.  On March 21, 2012, IFC announced its renewal of the show for a third season. On June 12, 2013, the network announced its renewal of Portlandia for fourth and fifth seasons, of ten episodes each, that aired in early 2014 and early 2015. On February 10, 2015, it was announced that IFC had picked up Portlandia for sixth and seventh seasons.

In January 2017, the series was renewed for an eighth and final season to debut in 2018.  Filming for the final season began in Portland in June 2017.

Series overview

Characters

Most of the sketches on Portlandia feature Armisen and Brownstein playing one of a variety of pairs of characters, most of which appear in multiple episodes. One of those pairings is "Fred and Carrie", a naturalistic depiction that is supposed to represent versions of the actors as if they were friends living together in a house in Portland. Most of the others use makeup, costumes, and wigs to depict pairings both young and old of various types. Sometimes cross-dressing is used, as when Armisen portrays Candace, co-owner of the Women and Women First bookstore, Brownstein plays Andy, a men's rights activist, or when Armisen and Brownstein swap genders to play the couple Nina and Lance.

There are also a small number of recurring characters played by other actors, such as the Mayor of Portland and his assistant (played by Kyle MacLachlan and Sam Adams, the actual mayor from 2009 to 2012), Fred and Carrie's landlord (played by Steve Buscemi, who also directed several episodes), Angel (played by Angel Bouchet, who appears in multiple episodes as herself), a swinger couple (played by Ebbe Roe Smith and Kristine Levine), an owner of many quirky shops (played by Jeff Goldblum) and Carrie's mom (played by Mickey Ronningen, seasons 2, 3, and 5).

Actor Jedediah P. Aaker has appeared on more episodes of the series than any other actors, not including the series' two leads.

Reception

Portlandia debuted on IFC on January 21, 2011. IFC "cheered" the first episode's Nielsen ratings of 263,000 viewers (live plus same day); factoring in repeats and three days' worth of DVR viewings, the number grew to 725,000, a figure that does not include an estimated 500,000 online preview viewings on IFC.com, Hulu and YouTube during the days before the official IFC premiere. As of May 1, 2012, the series was available to watch on Netflix in Ireland and the UK.

The show has received mostly positive reviews from television critics. Review aggregator site Metacritic has given the first season a rating of 71 out of 100, and the second season a rating of 75 out of 100. Both of these ratings fall within the site's range of "generally favorable reviews". Robert Lloyd of the Los Angeles Times called the show "funny and charming." Verne Gay of Newsday awarded the series an "A" grade and called it "hilarious". He noted that "Brownstein and Armisen move so effortlessly between characters, then execute their riffs, tics, styles and voices with such skilled abandon that before long this doesn't seem like satire any longer but a fun house mirror reflection of intensely real people." Contrarily, Brian Lowry, writing for Variety, noted that the show was "clearly on a shoestring budget" and said that it featured an "array of tiresome characters" that provided "further proof not everyone deserves a sketch comedy showcase - especially when the premise cuts no deeper than vignettes inspired by the wheat-germy, hippie-ish environs of Portland, Ore."  Comedian Jerry Seinfeld is a fan of the show. In a 2014 interview he said, "I think that's the best comedy on TV right now, and it's easily one of the best comedies of all time".

The sketches set in the feminist bookstore "Women and Women First" were filmed in an actual independent bookstore, In Other Words; this name can be seen on the chalkboard listing in-store events behind the cash register. At one point the real bookstore and community center used the show to promote itself, but the relationship broke down in 2016. The volunteer board wrote in a blog post that the bookstore and staff were mistreated during a filming session, and went on to say that "the Women and Women First segments ... are trans-antagonistic and trans-misogynist and have only become more offensive as the show goes on."

Awards and nominations
Portlandia won a Peabody Award in 2011 "for its good-natured lampooning of hipster culture, which hits the mark whether or not you’re in on the joke." Portlandia also won an Emmy Award in 2011 for Outstanding Costumes for a Variety Program or Special and was also nominated for Outstanding Directing for a Variety Series and Outstanding Writing for a Variety Series in the 64th Primetime Emmy Awards. Former Portland mayor Sam Adams (2009 to 2012) also appeared on the show and proclaimed January 21, 2011, Portlandia Day. The proclamation included a decorative bird, referring to a joke in the TV series. A bicycle tour company began offering Portlandia tours.

For the 66th Primetime Emmy Awards, the show received nominations in Outstanding Supporting Actor in a Comedy Series for Fred Armisen, Outstanding Writing for a Variety Series, Outstanding Directing for a Variety Series for Jonathan Krisel, and Outstanding Guest Actor in a Comedy Series for Steve Buscemi for the episode "Celery".

Home media and international release
Portlandia: Season One was released on Region 1 DVD and Blu-ray on December 6, 2011, and Region 4 on August 1, 2012. The one disc set consists of all six episodes of its first season. Special features include; Extended Scenes, Bloopers, An IFC Behind-the-Scenes Featurette, "Thunder Ant" Sketches, and Audio Commentary by Armisen and Brownstein.

Portlandia: Season Two was released on Region 1 DVD and Blu-ray on September 25, 2012, and Region 4 on August 7, 2013. The two disc set consists of all ten episodes of season two. Special features include; "Portlandia: the Tour: Seattle" Featurette, "Inside Portlandia" Featurette, "Feminist Bookstore" Deleted Scene, "Brunch Village: the Director's Cut", Excerpt from the Portlandia book and Audio Commentary by Armisen, Brownstein and Krisel.

There is also a combination set of both seasons available. Portlandia was also distributed in some countries on the iTunes store, Netflix and Amazon Video. In Australia it is screened on the Australian Broadcasting Corporation's station ABC2 and on its iView video streaming service. The series was premiered in Latin America on March 27, 2012, on the channel I.Sat.

Season 3 through 6 DVDs are widely available in the used market. Seasons 7 and 8 DVDs, while available for rent in video stores, are difficult to find. It is unclear whether Season 3 through Season 8 DVDs are pirated, rather than official releases. All seasons are available for streaming on multiple streaming channels.

See also
"The Day the Earth Stood Cool", a 2012 episode of The Simpsons featuring Armisen and Brownstein
Lady Dynamite, a television series starring Maria Bamford that crossed over with Portlandia at the end of season seven

References

External links

 

 
2011 American television series debuts
2018 American television series endings
2010s American satirical television series
2010s American sketch comedy television series
2010s American surreal comedy television series
Cross-dressing in television
English-language television shows
IFC (American TV channel) original programming
Peabody Award-winning television programs
Television series based on Internet-based works
Television series by Broadway Video
Television shows filmed in Oregon
Television shows set in Portland, Oregon
Television shows set in Oregon